The Wembley Lions were a  motorcycle speedway team which operated from 1929 until their closure in 1971. Their track was located at Wembley Stadium, Wembley Park, London.

The original stadium which hosted speedway has been redeveloped.

Brief history

Pre-war
After opening in 1929, the Lions joined the Southern League (1929-1931), winning it in 1930 and 1931. The 1932 season saw them join the National League which they won at the first attempt. The Lions continued to compete in the National League until the outbreak of World War II .

1946–1957
After the war Wembley continued in the National League, winning the title in the opening season in 1946. The following season they retained their title. The Lions operated until the end of the 1956 season, winning the title a further five times (successive titles between 1949 and 1953) but in 1957 they withdrew from the league before the season started due to the death of Sir Arthur Elvin, the chairman of Wembley Stadium. Many of the Wembley "home" meetings in 1948 were staged at Wimbledon as the Empire Stadium was used for the 1948 Summer Olympics.

During this era, speedway went through the biggest crowd "boom" in its history.  Wembley, who ran league meetings every Thursday, had by far the biggest crowds.  The average weekly attendances were around the 60,000 mark from 1946–1951, with one meeting of note, a London Cup match between Wembley and West Ham, drawing an estimated crowd of 85,000 with 20,000 locked outside, listening to a BBC radio commentary of the match via loudspeakers set up in the car park. Towards the mid-1950s speedway crowds fell away dramatically and Wembley's last season in 1956 saw average attendances of around the 15,000 mark.

1970–1971
In 1970, Wembley speedway returned, entering the British League. Promoters Trevor Redmond and Bernard Cottrell bought their licence and the contracts of some of the riders from the Edinburgh Monarchs promoter Ian Hoskins who was operating at Coatbridge. The Lions only managed to stay in operation for two seasons due to the stadium not being able to support speedway at all times due to commitments to other events being held there.

Big events
Wembley staged the Speedway World Championship Final continuously from 1936 to 1938 and then when it was re-introduced after World War II from 1949 to 1960. It went on to stage the championship a further nine times before the last contest at Wembley in 1981. Lions riders won in 1936 (Lionel Van Praag), 1949 (Tommy Price), and 1950 and 1953 (Freddie Williams).
Wembley also hosted the British Riders' Championships Finals 1946 to 1948.

Notable Wembley riders

Season summary

+3rd when season suspended and jointly declared National Trophy winner with Belle Vue

References

Defunct British speedway teams
Speedway teams in London
Wembley Stadium